Elliot Max Tucker-Drob is Professor of Psychology at the University of Texas at Austin, where he is also a Professor of Psychiatry, a faculty research associate at the Population Research Center, a faculty research associate at the Center for Aging and Population Studies, and director of the Lifespan Development Lab. He is the co-founder and co-director of the Texas Twin Project. He is known for his research in the fields of developmental psychology, cognitive aging, behavioral genetics, and statistical genetics. This has included research on the effects of education and socioeconomic status on children's cognitive development and academic achievement; cognitive aging and dementia; the genetic architecture of psychiatric disorders; and the development of Genomic Structural Equation Modelling, a statistical framework for the multivariate analysis of genome-wide association study data.

References

External links
Faculty page

Living people
University of Texas at Austin faculty
American developmental psychologists
Cornell University alumni
University of Virginia alumni
Year of birth missing (living people)
Behavior geneticists